The list of Delta Kappa Epsilon brothers (commonly referred to as Dekes) includes initiated and honorary members of Delta Kappa Epsilon.

Delta Kappa Epsilon counts many political, business, sports, education, science, and arts leaders.  Listed is a sample of some famous Dekes.

Presidents of the United States
19th President, Rutherford B. Hayes, Delta Chi
26th President, Theodore Roosevelt, Alpha
38th President, Gerald R. Ford, Omicron
41st President, George H. W. Bush, Phi  
43rd President, George W. Bush, Phi

Note:
 32nd President, Franklin D. Roosevelt, Alpha
Franklin D. Roosevelt was a member of the Alpha Chapter of DKE at Harvard and would be considered the sixth DKE brother to serve as President of the United States; however, the Harvard chapter was de-recognized by DKE International due to the chapter's stance on dual membership with other fraternities.

Vice Presidents of the United States
Theodore Roosevelt, Alpha
Gerald R. Ford, Omicron
George H. W. Bush, Phi  
J. Danforth Quayle, Psi Phi

Justices of the United States Supreme Court
Harold H. Burton, Theta  
John Hessin Clarke, Beta Chi  
Potter Stewart, Phi
Brett Kavanaugh, Phi

Nobel Laureates 

John F. Enders, Phi, 1954 Nobel Prize winner in Medicine
James P. Allison, Omega Chi, 2018 Nobel Prize winner in Medicine

Pulitzer Prize winners 

 Harvey Cushing, Phi, 1926 Pulitzer Prize winner in biography
 Charles Ives, Phi, 1947 Pulitzer Prize winner in music
 Virginius Dabney, Eta, 1948 Pulitzer Prize winner in editorial writing
 Ira B. Harkey Jr., Tau Lambda, 1963 Pulitzer Prize winner in editorial writing
 Dean G. Anderson, Phi, 1970 Pulitzer Prize winner in history
 Walter A. McDougall, Sigma, 1985 Pulitzer Prize winner in biography

Newspaper publishers and editors 

Norman Chandler, Sigma Rho, publisher,  Los Angeles Times
Otis Chandler, Sigma Rho, publisher,  Los Angeles Times 
William Randolph Hearst, Alpha, publisher,  Hearst Newspapers 
Eugene Pulliam, Psi Phi, publisher, Indianapolis Newspapers, Inc. 
Whitelaw Reid, Kappa, editor-in-chief, New York Tribune 
Ogden Reid, Phi – New York Tribune
James C. Quayle, Psi Phi, chairman, Huntington Newspapers, Inc
Briton Hadden, Phi, co-founder of Time Magazine
John Wright Sifton, Alpha Tau, President of Manitoba Free Press

Agency heads
Rear Admiral Sidney W. Souers, Kappa – first director of the Central Intelligence Agency
Sargent Shriver, Phi – Founder and first director of the Peace Corps

Businessmen
John F. Akers, Phi – past president of IBM 
Frank Batten, Eta – founder Weather Channel
Edward Bausch, Beta Phi – Bausch & Lomb Opticals
Alfred R. Berkeley III Eta – former Nasdaq president
Alfred Bloomingdale, Upsilon – founder of Diners Club International
Matthew Borden, Phi – Industrialist
Lawrence Bossidy, Mu – Chairman of Honeywell
Charles Sterling Bunnell, Phi – CitiBank
Dave Calhoun, Sigma Alpha – Boeing
James Boorman Colgate, Mu – Colgate-Palmolive
Donald Fisher, Theta Zeta – Founder and Past Chairman of Gap Inc.
Theodore J. Forstmann, Phi – financier, subject of the book and movie Barbarians at the Gate: The Fall of RJR Nabisco 
James Gamble, Lambda – Procter & Gamble
Rutherford P. Hayes, Delta Chi - Librarian and banker
Webb Hayes, Delta Chi - co-founder of Union Carbide, Congressional Medal of Honor
Walter Hoving, Upsilon – Tiffany & Co.  
Herb Kelleher, Gamma Phi – Southwest Airlines
Robert Lehman, Phi – Lehman Brothers
Craig McCaw, Sigma Rho – McCaw Communications, cellular telephones
Bradley Palmer, Alpha - Founder of United Fruit Company, Gillette, and ITT
John Pierpont Morgan, Jr., Alpha – financier
Frederick W. Smith, Phi – FedEx
William L. Trenholm, Delta – North American Trust Company, Comptroller of the Currency
John Hay Whitney, Phi – New York Herald Tribune, Ambassador to England, art collector
Joseph Wilson, Beta Phi – Xerox
Dean Witter, Jr., Phi – Dean Witter Reynolds (Now part of Morgan Stanley)
William Wrigley III, Phi – Wrigley Company
August Belmont, Jr., Alpha – Belmont Racetrack

Political figures
Dean G. Acheson, Phi – Secretary of State under Harry S. Truman, Architect of Cold War Foreign Policy
Larz Anderson, Alpha – U.S. Ambassador to Japan and Belgium
Robert Bacon, Alpha – US Secretary of State
Nathaniel Banks, Sigma – Speaker of the United States House of Representatives
Ron DeSantis, Phi  –  Governor of Florida (2019 - Present)
Albert J. Beveridge, Psi Phi – U.S. Senator, Indiana
James G. Blaine, Theta – Speaker of the United States House of Representatives, presidential candidate, United States Secretary of State under James Garfield and Chester Arthur.
Matthew Butler, Delta – U.S. Senator, South Carolina 1877-1895
Gaston Caperton, Beta – Governor of West Virginia 1989–1997
John Chafee, Phi – Secretary of the Navy, Governor of Rhode Island, U.S. Senator
Sutemi Chinda, Psi Phi – Secretary of State of the Empire of Japan (The Washington, D.C. Cherry trees were presented by him and his wife on behalf of the people of Japan in 1912)
Chris Coons, Sigma – U.S. Senator, Delaware
Royal S. Copeland, Omicron – U.S. Senator of New York 1923–1938
Mark Dayton, Phi, U.S. Senator and Governor, Minnesota
George A. Drew, Alpha Phi – Premier of Ontario, leader of the Progressive Conservative Party of Canada, Leader of the Opposition
Thomas F. Eagleton, Sigma – U.S. Democratic Senator Missouri, VP Candidate 1972
Donald Ensenat, Phi – US Ambassador, Chief Of Protocol
Keith Falconer Fletcher – Massachusetts legislator
Murphy J. "Mike" Foster, Zeta Zeta – two-term Governor of Louisiana
 Justice George Alexander Gale – former Chief Justice of Ontario
Asa Bird Gardiner - New York County District Attorney
Gordon Gray, Beta – Assistant secretary of war under Harry Truman
Lister Hill, Psi – U.S. Senator of Alabama 1938–1969
Tony Knowles, Phi, two-term Governor of Alaska
Robert Todd Lincoln, Alpha – Secretary of War, son of Abraham Lincoln
Bob Livingston, Tau Lambda – United States House of Representatives, Louisiana
Henry Cabot Lodge, Alpha – Senate Majority Leader
Russell B. Long, Zeta Zeta – Senate Majority Whip, Democrat from Louisiana
Nicholas Longworth, Alpha – Speaker of the United States House of Representatives
Donald S. MacDonald, former Canadian Minister of Finance, and High Commissioner to the United Kingdom 
Mario García Menocal, Delta Chi – President of the Republic of Cuba
George Pataki, Phi, Governor New York
J. Danforth Quayle- Vice-President of the United States (1989–1993), US Senator and Representative Indiana
Clark T. Randt, Jr., Phi – longest-serving U.S. Ambassador of China
Peter F. Schabarum, Theta Zeta – American football player, member of Los Angeles County Board of Supervisors from 1972 to 1991
Don Siegelman, Psi, Governor Alabama
William Simon, Rho – Secretary of the Treasury
Ted Stevens, Theta Rho, U.S. Senator, Senate Pro Tem, Alaska
Robert Taft, Jr., Phi – Republican Senator from Ohio, author of modern Labor Law
Richard W. Thompson – Psi Phi – Secretary of the Navy 1877–1880 
John De Witt Warner, Delta Chi – United States House of Representatives, New York
Yung Wing, Phi – Chinese Diplomat to the United States. Founder of the Chinese Educational Mission in 1872.
Michael M. Wood, Phi – U.S. Ambassador to Sweden
Robert D. Orr, Phi - 45th Governor of Indiana

Sports and entertainment
Mike Babcock, Tau Alpha – Former Head Coach of the Toronto Maple Leafs and only coach in the  Triple Gold Club
Jack Agrios, Delta Phi – Chairman of the IAAF World Championships in Athletics Committee 2001
Frankie Albert, Sigma Rho – football player, invented bootleg play, Coach San Francisco 49ers
William Bartholomay, Delta Epsilon – former owner of the Atlanta Braves
Sebastian Bea, Theta Zeta – Crew, Olympic Silver Medalist 2000 Men's Pair w/o Coxswain (2-)
August Belmont Jr., Alpha - First president of the Jockey Club, building of Belmont Park racetrack, and breeder of Man O' War.
Roland Betts, Phi – US Olympic Committee, and founder, chairman and chief executive officer of Chelsea Piers, L.P., which operates the Chelsea Piers Sports and Entertainment Complex in Manhattan.
Dana X. Bible – College Football head coach at University of Texas, University of Nebraska-Lincoln, Texas A&M, Louisiana State and Mississippi College 
Clinton W. Blume, Mu – pitcher New York Giants, 1922 World Series, President, Real Estate Board of New York, 1955
Paul Brown, Kappa – Hall of Fame Football Coach & Founder of the Cleveland Browns and owner of the Cincinnati Bengals
Walter Camp, Phi – Father of American Football  
Dick Clark, Phi Gamma – hosted American Bandstand 
Billy Crudup, Beta – actor
Hugh Culverhouse, Psi – owner of Tampa Bay Buccaneers  
Michael Eben – former Toronto Argonauts player
James Elder, Alpha Phi – Olympic Gold Medalist Equestrian Team (1968)
Marcus Giamatti – actor
A. Bartlett Giamatti, Phi – Commissioner of Major League Baseball  
Harry Hamlin, Theta Zeta – actor   
 Hagood Hardy – Pianist and Composer 
Lawren Harris, Alpha Phi, – Canadian artist and member of the Group of Seven
Howard Hawks, Delta Chi – film director, producer and screenwriter
Calvin Hill, Phi – Professional Football Player for the Dallas Cowboys, the Washington Redskins, and the Cleveland Browns
Craig Hummer, Lambda – International Ironman champion (lifeguarding), sportscaster
Charles Ives, Phi – composer
Robert Trent Jones, Delta Chi – Famed Golf Course Designer
Robert J. Kelleher, Epsilon – Hall of Fame tennis player and official
Larry Kelley, Phi – 1936 Heisman Trophy winner
Troy Kinney – artist
Thomas W. Landry, Omega Chi – coach of Dallas Cowboys 
Angelo "Hank" Luisetti, Sigma Rho – one of the most famous college basketball players of all time
Michael Macari, Epsilon Rho – Film Producer (The Ring)
Tex McCrary, Phi, Radio/TV personality, led the recruitment of Dwight Eisenhower for President 
David Milch, Phi – writer and producer  
Frank Nesmith Parsons, Pi – Chief Justice of the New Hampshire Supreme Court, 1902–1924
Joe Paterno, Upsilon – Penn State football coach
Bob Pettit, Zeta Zeta – National Basketball Association All star and hall of famer.
Cole Porter, Phi – composer
J. Burton Rix, Pi – Football and basketball coach at Texas, SMU, and Miami
Don Schollander, Phi – won four gold medals in swimming in the 1964 Summer Olympics
Root Boy Slim, Phi – rock singer
 Dr. Charles Snelling – former Canadian Olympian
George Steinbrenner, Epsilon – owner of the New York Yankees  
Matt Stover, Alpha Omega – placekicker in the National Football League
Chris Strouth, Phi Epsilon – musician, producer, writer and filmmaker 
Pat Turner – former Canadian Olympian
Richard Weinberger, Beta Tau – Olympian Long Distance Swimming Medalist
Wheelock Whitney, Jr., Owner Minnesota Vikings and Minnesota Twins
Jonathan Winters, Lambda – comedian and writer
Josh Zuckerman, Zeta – Actor

Other famous Dekes
Alan Bean, Omega Chi – Apollo astronaut, fourth man on the moon
Edward Bellamy, Theta Chi – author
Bruce D. Benson, Delta Chi - President, University of Colorado
Frederick H. Brooke, architect
Dale Chihuly, Kappa Epsilon – glass artist
Harvey Weir Cook, Psi Phi – Aviation pioneer, Indianapolis Airport named in his honor
Melvil Dewey, Sigma – devised the Dewey Decimal System
Charles Alton Ellis, Gamma Phi – designed the Golden Gate Bridge
Gregory L. Fenves. Delta Chi - President, Emory University
Prince Friso of Orange-Nassau, Theta Zeta – Second son of Queen Beatrix of the Netherlands
Nathaniel Hawthorne, Theta – Author
Paul M. Hebert, Zeta Zeta – Judge United States Military Tribunals in Nuremberg
Stanley King, Sigma – Eleventh president of Amherst College from 1932 to 1946
Peyton C. March, Rho – American soldier and Chief of Staff of the United States Army from May 1918 through June 1921
Robert E. Peary, Theta – first man to reach the North Pole
Calvin Plimpton, Sigma – President of Amherst College and American University of Beirut
Baron Hirai Seijirō, Psi Omega  – President, Japanese Railways
Oscar Tang, Phi – New York financier and philanthropist. Current Head of the Board of Trustees for Phillips Academy.
Ming Tsai, Phi – Chinese-American fusion cuisine chef, restaurateur, and Emmy Award-winning television personality
Jeme Tien Yow, Phi – Director of Chinese Railroads, Chinese (Qing Dynasty) Empire
Ryan Serhant – New York real estate broker through Nest Seekers International. Also one of the stars of Million Dollar Listing New York

References

External links
Prominent Alumni

Lists of members of United States student societies
brothers